Ray Powell may refer to:

 Ray Powell (baseball) (1888–1962), Major League Baseball player
 Ray Powell (Australian footballer) (1923–1993), Australian rules footballer
 Ray Powell (Welsh footballer) (1924–2014), Welsh association footballer
 Ray Powell (ice hockey) (1925–1998), ice hockey player with the Chicago Black Hawks
 Ray Powell (New Mexico politician), New Mexico Land Commissioner
 Ray Powell (police officer), former president of the National Black Police Association
 Ray Powell (British politician) (1928–2001), member of Parliament of the United Kingdom
 Ray Edwin Powell (1887–1973), founder of Alcan